is a people mover station in Sakura, Chiba Prefecture, Japan. It is on the Yamaman Yūkarigaoka Line, serving the planned community of Yūkarigaoka. Trains run roughly every 20 minutes. Trains only run in one direction from this station, towards Kōen Station.

Gallery

Adjacent stations

References

Railway stations in Chiba Prefecture
Railway stations in Japan opened in 1983